A Sunday magazine is a publication inserted into a Sunday newspaper.

Sunday magazine or The Sunday Magazine may also refer to:

 The Sunday Magazine (radio program), airing on CBC radio
 The Sunday Magazine (magazine), published 1864–1905
 Sunday reading periodical, a magazine genre in Victorian Britain

See also
 
 Sunday (magazine)